Sanah śpiewa poezyje is the fourth studio album by Polish singer Sanah. It was released by Magic Records and Universal Music Polska on 25 November 2022.

Sanah śpiewa poezyje is a combination of indie pop and sung poetry. The album was produced by Marek Dziedzic, Arkadiusz Kopera, Thomas Martin Leithead-Docherty (Tom Martin) and Jakub Galiński.

It peaked at number one on the Polish albums chart and has been certified platinum by the Polish Society of the Phonographic Industry (ZPAV) on 30 November 2022.

On 13 October 2022, she released ten more singles, each modeled on poems by Polish national bards, including Adam Mickiewicz, Wisława Szymborska and Adam Asnyk.

Track listing

Charts

Weekly charts

Year-end charts

Certifications

Release history

See also
 List of number-one albums of 2022 (Poland)

References

2022 albums
Polish-language albums
Sanah (singer) albums
Magic Records albums
Universal Music Group albums